These file systems have been the default file system of the Apple Macintosh:

 The Macintosh File System or MFS, 1984–1985, full support discontinued with System 7.6.1
 The Hierarchical File System or HFS, 1985 until the release of Mac OS X, was still in 2007, but as of Mac OS X 10.6 only as read-only
 The Hierarchical File System Plus or HFS+, released 1998, default since Mac OS X, until APFS replaced
 Apple File System (APFS), released in 2017, default since macOS High Sierra